Miaodao (died after 1134) was a Chinese Buddhist abbess and master, lüshi. 

She was a daughter of minister Huang Shang (1044-1130) and became a nun at the age of twenty. She was a student of Zhenxie Qinguao in the Caodong school in Xuefeng, and from 1134 at Dahui Zonggao. She became a noted master and respected lecturer within Chan Buddhism, served as abbess in several convents and gave lessons particularly but not exclusively to women. Women played an important part within Chan Buddhism, and Miaodao was contemporary with her female colleague Miaozong.

References 
 Lily Xiao Hong Lee, Sue Wiles: Biographical Dictionary of Chinese Women, Volume II: Tang Through Ming 618 - 1644

12th-century deaths
Chinese Buddhist nuns
12th-century Chinese people
12th-century Chinese women
Buddhist abbesses
11th-century Buddhist nuns
12th-century Buddhist nuns